Laidman Browne (13 September 1896 - 11 September 1961) was an English radio and television actor. In 1949 he was the narrator of Arthur Conan Doyle's Sherlock Holmes story "The Adventure of the Speckled Band", the first book read on the BBC's long-running series A Book at Bedtime.

Filmography

References

External links 
 

1896 births
1961 deaths
20th-century English male actors
Male actors from Newcastle upon Tyne
English male radio actors
English male television actors